Welk or WELK may refer to:

People
 Ehm Welk (1884–1966), German writer
 Lawrence Welk (1903–1992), American musician
 Stephan Welk (born 1967), German economist

Places
Welk, a village in Poland

Other
WELK, a West Virginian radio station

See also
 
 Whelk, a sea snail

Surnames from nicknames